Australia competed at the 1972 Summer Olympics in Munich, West Germany.  Australian athletes have competed in every Summer Olympic Games. 168 competitors, 139 men and 29 women, took part in 110 events in 20 sports.

Medalists

Gold
Shane Gould — Swimming, Women's 200m Individual Medley
Shane Gould — Swimming, Women's 200m Freestyle
Shane Gould — Swimming, Women's 400m Freestyle
Beverley Whitfield — Swimming, Women's 200m Breaststroke
Gail Neall — Swimming, Women's 400m Individual Medley
Bradford Cooper — Swimming, Men's 400m Freestyle
John Anderson and David Forbes — Sailing, Men's Star Team Competition
Thomas Anderson, John Cuneo and John Shaw — Sailing, Men's Dragon Team Competition

Silver
Raelene Boyle — Athletics, Women's 100m
Raelene Boyle — Athletics, Women's 200m
John Nicholson — Cycling, Men's 1.000m Sprint (Scratch)
Danny Clark — Cycling, Men's 1.000m Time Trial
Clyde Sefton — Cycling, Men's Individual Road Race
Shane Gould — Swimming, Women's 800m Freestyle
Graham Windeatt — Swimming, Men's 1.500m Freestyle

Bronze
Shane Gould — Swimming, Women's 100m Freestyle
Beverley Whitfield — Swimming, Women's 100m Breaststroke

Archery

In the first modern archery competition at the Olympics, Australia entered two men and one woman. Their highest placing competitors were Terene Donovan and Graeme Telford, who both placed 9th place in their respective competitions.

Women's Individual Competition:
Terene Donovan - 2356 points (→ 9th place)

Men's Individual Competition:
Graeme Telford - 2423 points (→ 9th place)
Terry Reilly - 2387 points (→ 15th place)

Athletics

Men's 800 metres
Graeme Rootham
 Heat — 1:48.2 (→ did not advance)

Men's 1.500 metres
Chris Fisher
 Heat — 3:42.5
 Semifinals — 3:42.0 (→ did not advance)

Men's 5.000 metres
Tony Benson
 Heat — 13:42.8 (→ did not advance)
Kerry O'Brien
 Heat — did not start (→ did not advance)

Men's 3.000m Steeplechase
Kerry O'Brien
 Qualifying Heat — did not finish (→ did not advance)

Men's High Jump
Lawrie Peckham
 Qualifying Round — 2.15m
 Final — 2.10m (→ 18th place)

Basketball

Men's Team Competition
Preliminary Round (Group A):
 Lost to Spain (74-79)
 Lost to United States (55-81)
 Lost to Czechoslovakia (68-69)
 Defeated Japan (92-76)
 Lost to Cuba (70-84)
 Defeated Brazil (75-69)
 Defeated Egypt (89-66)
Classification Matches:
 9th/12th place: Defeated West Germany (70-69)
 9th/10th place: Defeated Poland (91-83) → 9th place
Team Roster:
 Glenn Marsland
 Ian Watson
 Richard Duke
 Bill Wyatt
 Eddie Palubinskas
 Brian Kerle
 Peter Byrne
 Perry Crosswhite
 Ray Tomlinson
 Ken James
 Tom Bender
 Toli Koltuniewicz
Head coach: Lindsay Gaze

Boxing

Men's Light Middleweight (– 71 kg)
Alan Jenkinson
 First Round — Bye
 Second Round — Defeated Michel Belliard (FRA), 4:1
 Third Round — Lost to Mohamed Majeri (TUN), 0:5

Canoeing

Cycling

Ten cyclists represented Australia in 1972.

Individual road race
 Clyde Sefton —  Silver Medal
 David Jose — 29th place
 John Trevorrow — 32nd place
 Donald Allan — 58th place

Team time trial
 Donald Allan
 Graeme Jose
 Clyde Sefton
 John Trevorrow

Sprint
 John Nicholson

1000m time trial
 Daniel Clark
 Final — 1:06.87 (→  Silver Medal)

Individual pursuit
 John Bylsma

Team pursuit
 Steele Bishop
 Danny Clark
 Remo Sansonetti
 Philip Sawyer

Diving

Men's 3m Springboard:
Donald Wagstaff — 344.13 points (→ 13th place)
Kenneth Grove — 302.91 points (→ 29th place)

Men's 10m Platform:
Donald Wagstaff — 435.84 points (→ 11th place)
Kenneth Grove — 254.73 points (→ 32nd place)

Women's 10m Platform:
Glenise-Ann Jones — 157.20 points (→ 26th place)

Equestrian

Fencing

Four fencers, two men and two women, represented Australia in 1972.

Men's foil
 Ernest Simon
 Greg Benko

Women's foil
 Marion Exelby
 Christine McDougall

Gymnastics

Hockey

Men's Team Competition
Preliminary Round (Group B)
 Drew with New Zealand (0-0)
 Defeated Kenya (3-1)
 Lost to India (1-3)
 Defeated Mexico (10-0)
 Drew with Great Britain (1-1)
 Defeated Poland (1-0)
 Lost to the Netherlands (2-3)
Semi Final Round
 Defeated Malaysia (2-1)
Classification Match
 5th/6th place: Defeated Great Britain (2-1) after extra time → 5th place
Team Roster
 Robert Andrew
 Greg Browning
 Ric Charlesworth
 Paul Dearing
 Brian Glencross
 Robert Haigh
 Wayne Hammond
 James Mason
 Terry McAskell
 Patrick Nilan
 Desmond Piper
 Graeme Reid
 Ronald Riley
 Donald Smart
 Ronald Wilson

Judo

Modern pentathlon

Two male pentathletes represented Australia in 1972.

Men's Individual Competition:
Robert Barrie — 4600 points (→ 32nd place)
Peter Macken — 4449 points (→ 41st place)

Rowing

Sailing

Shooting

Four male shooters represented Australia in 1972.
Mixed

Swimming

Men's 100m Freestyle
Michael Wenden
 Heat — 52.34s
 Semifinals — 53.32s
 Final — 52.41s (→ 5th place)
Greg Rogers
 Heat — 53.98s
 Semifinals — 54.26s (→ did not advance)
Neil Rogers
 Heat — 55.32s (→  did not advance)

Men's 200m Freestyle
Michael Wenden
 Heat — 1:56.66
 Final — 1:54.40 (→  4th place)
Graham White
 Heat — 1:58.60 (→  did not advance)
Robert Nay
 Heat — 1:57.69 (→  did not advance)

Men's 4 × 100 m Freestyle Relay
Neil Rogers, Graham White, Bruce Featherston and Greg Rogers
 Heat — 3:40.47 (→  did not advance)

Men's 4 × 200 m Freestyle Relay
 Graham Windeatt, Bruce Featherstone, Michael Wenden, and Graham White
 Heat — 7:49.03
Michael Wenden, Graham Windeatt, Robert Nay, and Bradford Cooper
 Final — 7:48.66 (→ 5th place)

Men's 200m Butterfly
 James Norman Findlay
 Heat — 2:08.36 ( 4th Place)

Men's 200m Individual Medley
 James Norman Findlay
 Heat — 2:20.08 ( 6th Place)

Water polo

Weightlifting

Wrestling

See also
Australia at the 1970 British Commonwealth Games
Australia at the 1974 British Commonwealth Games

References

1972 Summer Olympics
Nations at the 1972 Summer Olympics
Olympics